Blomberg is a surname. Notable people with the surname include:

 Freiherr von Blomberg family
 Astrid Blomberg (born 1937), Swedish curler
 Craig Blomberg (born 1955), American theologian
 Hugo von Blomberg (1820–1871), German artist and poet
 Jaakko Blomberg (born 1942), Finnish diplomat
 Jan Axel Blomberg (born 1969), Norwegian drummer
 Leif Blomberg (1941–1998), Swedish trade unionist and politician
 Martin P. Blomberg (1888–1966), Swedish-American engineer 
 Ron Blomberg (born 1948), American baseball player
 Werner von Blomberg (1878–1946), German politician and military officer

See also
 Bloomberg (disambiguation)

German-language surnames